Holasteridae is an extinct  family of sea urchins.

These semi-infaunal detritivores lived during the Cretaceous period, from 140.2 to 53.0 Ma.

Genera

References

Holasteroida